"Algo Mágico" is a song recorded by Puerto Rican singer Rauw Alejandro for his debut studio album, Afrodisíaco (2020). The song was written by Mr. NaisGai, Alejandro, Jesus D. Valencia, Miky, Maiky, Elektrik, Maya, Sinatra, Colla, Eric Duars, while the production was handled by Elektrik, Mr. Naisgai, Maya, Sinatra, Miky, Maiky, and Caleb Calloway. It was released for digital download and streaming by Sony Music Latin and Duars Entertainment on June 25, 2020, as the second promotional single from the album. A Spanish language contemporary pop and electronic house song, it is "an oath to inner beauty and unconditional love", meant to be dedicated to someone special.

"Algo Mágico" received positive reviews from music critics, who complimented its fusion of genres and sounds. The song peaked at numbers 69 and 100 in Spain and Argentina, respectively, and was certified diamond + platinum in Mexico. An accompanying fanciful animated music video, released simultaneously with the song, was directed by Sebastián Mejia. The visual depicts two masked people traveling the world on a dragon, as they get to know each other deeply and unmask their feelings. It won the award for Best Animated Video at the 2020 Noise Colectivo Awards. A remix by Dutch-Moroccan producer R3hab was released on March 11, 2021, which was accompanied by another animated music video.

Background and release
In January 2020, Rauw Alejandro revealed the titles of four of his upcoming songs, including "Algo Mágico". In February 2020, he announced that he was working on his debut studio album Afrodisíaco. On May 19, 2020, he confirmed that "Algo Mágico" would be included in the album. Two weeks later he announced that the song was set to release in June 2020, noting that it is "a very special" song for him. The track was released for digital download and streaming by Sony Music Latin and Duars Entertainment as the second promotional single from Afrodisíaco on June 25, 2020. It was later included as the 13th track on the album, released November 13, 2020.

Music and lyrics

Musically, "Algo Mágico", is a Spanish language contemporary pop and electronic house song, with elements of trap, reggaeton, dance, pop-R&B, synth-pop, house, and urbano music. It was written by Mr. NaisGai, Alejandro, Jesus D. Valencia, Miky, Maiky, Elektrik, Maya, Sinatra, Colla, Eric Duars, with its production being handled by Elektrik, Mr. Naisgai, Maya, Sinatra, Miky, Maiky, and Caleb Calloway. The track runs for a total of 4 minutes and 21 seconds.

Lyrically, "Algo Mágico" which translates to "Something Magical" in English, it is "an oath to inner beauty and unconditional love", meant to be dedicated to someone special. It talks about a relationship that starts unexpectedly and that, as time goes by, many feelings emerge, thus becoming a song with a "public declaration of love". The lyrics include, "Sigo buscando las palabras / Pa' poderlo describir / Es algo mágico / Que tiene tu mirada / Que me hipnotizó" (I keep looking for the words / To be able to describe it / It's something magical / What does your look have? / that hypnotized me).

Reception

Critical 
Upon release, "Algo Mágico" was met with positive reviews from music critics. Jessica Roiz from Billboard praised the song's "innovative melodies" that flaunt the singer's "other artistic side" in addition to his reggaeton hits. She continued admiring the fusion of sounds and rhythms in the track that gives an "infectious dance beat", comparing it with Daft Punk and The Weeknd discography. Writing for El Sol de Tijuana, Andreína Longoria stated that Alejandro "demonstrates the versatility of his art and composition" with the song, incorporating sounds from different genres. Grammy.com critic Ecleen Luzmila Caraballo described it as "a futuristic pop song that lives up to its name". Rolling Stones Julyssa Lopez ranked the track among Alejandro's 10 Essential Songs, calling its production "futuristic". Also from Rolling Stone, Ernesto Lechner ranked "Algo Mágico" as the singer's 14th-best song and labeled it "the defining point where he weaves a personal language informed by trap and reggaetón, [while being inspired by] the Eighties pop".

Commercial 
"Algo Mágico" debuted and peaked at number 69 on Spain's official weekly chart on May 7, 2020. In Latin America, the song entered Billboard Argentina Hot 100 at number 100 on September 12, 2020, and was certified diamond + platinum by the Asociación Mexicana de Productores de Fonogramas y Videogramas (AMPROFON), for track-equivalent sales of over 360,000 units in Mexico.

Promotion

Music video

An accompanying fanciful animated music video was released simultaneously with the song. The visual was directed by Sebastián Mejia and inspired by Japanese-style characters. It depicts two masked people traveling the world on a dragon, as they get to know each other deeply and unmask their feelings. As animated music vides had went viral because of COVID-19 pandemic restrictions at the time, Billboard highlighted 10 animated music videos released in 2020, asking their readers to vote for their favorite one, in which "Algo Mágico" was voted the best animated music video of the year. The video also won the award for Best Animated Video at the 2020 Noise Colectivo Awards.

On July 7, 2020, Alejandro uploaded a dance video on his YouTube channel, which features himself dancing alongside his choreographer Fefe Burgos.

Live performances
"Algo Mágico" was included on the set lists for Alejandro's the Rauw Alejandro World Tour and the Vice Versa Tour.

Remix
A remix by Dutch-Moroccan producer R3hab was released on March 11, 2021. It was accompanied by an animated music video that continues the concept proposed by the original video, depicting a digitized Alejandro with a fox mask and portraying a dreamy and romantic journey.

Track listings

Credits and personnel
Credits adapted from Tidal.

 Rauw Alejandro associated performer, composer, lyricist
 Luis J. González "Mr. NaisGai" composer, lyricist, producer, mixing engineer, performance arranger, piano
 Jesus D. Valencia composer, lyricist
 Miky composer, lyricist, producer
 Maiky composer, lyricist, producer
 Elektrik composer, lyricist, producer
 Maya composer, lyricist, producer
 Sinatra composer, lyricist, producer
 José M. Collazo "Colla" composer, lyricist, mastering engineer, mixing engineer, recording engineer
 Eric Pérez Rovira "Eric Duars" composer, lyricist, executive producer
 Caleb Calloway producer
 Amber Rubi Urena A&R coordinator
 John Eddie Pérez A&R director

Charts

Certifications

Release history

References

2020 songs
2020 singles
Animated music videos
R3hab songs
Rauw Alejandro songs
Songs written by Rauw Alejandro
Sony Music Latin singles
Spanish-language songs